Adrian Kasztelan (born 27 July 1986) is a Polish footballer currently playing for AP ŁKS Łódź. He also played in Korona Kielce, Ruch Chorzów and Znicz Pruszków.

His father, Krzysztof Kasztelan was also a footballer for ŁKS Łódź.

References 

Polish footballers
Korona Kielce players
ŁKS Łódź players
Association football midfielders
Living people
1986 births
Footballers from Łódź